Yijing station is a Metro station of Shenzhen Metro Line 5. It opened on 22 June 2011.

Station layout

Exits

External links
 Shenzhen Metro Yijing Station (Chinese)
 Shenzhen Metro Yijing Station (English)

Shenzhen Metro stations
Railway stations in Guangdong
Luohu District
Railway stations in China opened in 2011